The Superliga Colombiana (Colombian Superleague), officially known as Superliga BetPlay DIMAYOR due to sponsorship by online betting company BetPlay, is an official competition contested between the winners of the Apertura and Finalización tournaments of the Colombian Categoría Primera A. The tournament is organized by the División Mayor del Fútbol Colombiano, DIMAYOR. The competition was created in 2012 and is played by the end of January of every year, at the start of each season. Its current champion is Atlético Nacional, who won their third title in 2023, while the most successful club is Santa Fe, with four titles.

History
By early 2012, the idea of a super cup competition between the champions of the Copa Colombia and one of the Categoría Primera A champions was being considered for implementation by DIMAYOR as well as Postobón, who sponsored the competitions organized by DIMAYOR at the time. According to the then chairman of DIMAYOR Ramón Jesurún, the competition would be played in January prior to the start of each season, but the project was yet to be approved.

The Superliga was eventually greenlit by the Assembly of DIMAYOR held on 27 March 2012, in which it was decided that it would be contested by the champions of the two Primera A tournaments played in the previous season (Apertura and Finalización), instead of the Copa Colombia champions as it was originally planned. The first edition of the competition was played by Atlético Nacional and Junior, champions of the 2011 Apertura and 2011 Finalización respectively, in July 2012.

Starting from the 2014 edition, the Superliga champions were awarded a berth to the Copa Sudamericana, qualifying for the Colombia 2 berth of that competition. This arrangement lasted until 2016, due to the change of format of the CONMEBOL club competitions, which started being played simultaneously year-round as well as the fact that both of the Primera A champions are already entitled to play the Copa Libertadores. Due to this, the competition went to only offer an economic incentive to both participants.

For 2020, and due to the schedule saturation caused by the 2020 CONMEBOL Pre-Olympic Tournament which was held in January 2020 as well as the 2020 Copa América which Colombia was originally selected to co-host and was scheduled for June, DIMAYOR considered playing the Superliga in May 2020 as a single match at a neutral venue outside the country, with Miami as the tentative host city, however, those plans were cancelled due to the COVID-19 pandemic.

Format
The competition is played as a double-legged series between the champions of the Categoría Primera A tournaments of the preceding season (Apertura and Finalización). The better placed team in the aggregate table of the previous season hosts the second leg. If both teams are tied in points at the end of the second leg, the team with the better goal difference will be the champion, and if still drawn the winner is decided in a penalty shootout.

In the event one team wins both tournaments of the season, its rival in the competition will be the best-placed team in the aggregate table of the previous season.

Seasons

Performance by club

References

External links
 Official website

 
Categoría Primera A
Football competitions in Colombia